Educating Esmé: Diary of a First Year Teacher is a book written by children's literature specialist and then elementary school teacher Esmé Raji Codell.  The book, presented in diary format, presents Esmé's first year teaching in an inner-city public school in Chicago; her joys, trials and experiences. The book was originally published in 1999.

References

External links
Planetesme.com

American memoirs
Books about education
1999 non-fiction books
English-language books
Algonquin Books books